Fretin is a commune in the Nord department in northern France. It is in the south of the Métropole Européenne de Lille.

Fretin junction

It contains the Fretin triangle, a high speed flying junction joining the HSL 1 railway line from Brussels to the LGV Nord from Paris to the Channel Tunnel.

Notable people
 Mathieu Debuchy (born 1985) a football player.

Heraldry

See also
Communes of the Nord department

References

Communes of Nord (French department)
French Flanders